Question 2 of 2000 and 2002 is a ballot measure that amended the Nevada Constitution by adding a definition of marriage that prevented same-sex marriages from being conducted or recognized in Nevada. The amendment was passed by voter referendum by a margin of 67%-33% on November 5, 2002. It was previously approved by 69.6% to 30.4% of voters in 2000; the Nevada Constitution requires two ballot votes for citizen-initiated constitutional amendments.

The measure was heavily influenced by the Church of Jesus Christ of Latter-day Saints (LDS church). A Nevada Mormon newspaper Beehive first reported the Coalition for the Protection of Marriage's intent to file an initiative petition in December 1999, and by October 2000 the coalition had raised over $800,000 from mostly Mormon-owned businesses and LDS individuals. Mormon leaders had strongly encouraged members through letters with church letterhead to do campaign work and post yard signs distributed at church buildings.

The text of the adopted amendment, which is found at Article I, section 21 of the Nevada Constitution, states:

Only a marriage between a male and female person shall be recognized and given effect in this state.

2020 Nevada Question 2 was a ballot measure to replace Article I, section 21 with language that requires the recognition of same-sex marriage in Nevada. It was passed on November 3, 2020, with 62% of the vote, making Nevada the first state to enshrine the right to same-sex marriage in a state constitution.

Polling

See also
Sevcik v. Sandoval — a case challenging Article I, Section 21

Notes

References

2002 in LGBT history
Initiatives in the United States
LGBT in Nevada
Same-sex marriage ballot measures in the United States
U.S. state constitutional amendments banning same-sex unions
2002 Nevada elections
2002 ballot measures
Nevada ballot measures